The 644th Radar Squadron is an inactive United States Air Force unit. It was last assigned to the 20th Air Division, Aerospace Defense Command, stationed at Richmond Air Force Station, Florida. It was inactivated on 1 April 1978.

The unit was a General Surveillance Radar squadron providing for the air defense of the United States.

Lineage
 Activated as the 644th Aircraft Control and Warning Squadron, 1 October 1954
 Inactivated on 1 October 1957
 Redesignated 644th Radar Squadron (SAGE)
 Activated 25 April 1960
 Redesignated 644th Radar Squadron, 1 February 1974
 Inactivated on 1 April 1978

Assignments
 4707th Air Defense Wing, 1 October 1954
 4622d Air Defense Wing, 18 October 1956
 Boston Air Defense Sector, 8 January 1957
 Montgomery Air Defense Sector, 25 April 1960
 32d Air Division, 1 April 1966
 33d Air Division, 14 November 1969
 20th Air Division, 19 November 1969 – 1 April 1978

Stations
 Syracuse AFS*, New York, 1 October 1954
 Portsmouth AFS, New Hampshire (renamed Rye AFS, New Hampshire, 1 July 1956), 1 July 1955 - 1 October 1957
  Richmond AFS, Florida, 26 April 1960 – 1 April 1978

.* Not manned or equipped

References

 Cornett, Lloyd H. and Johnson, Mildred W., A Handbook of Aerospace Defense Organization  1946 - 1980, Office of History, Aerospace Defense Center, Peterson AFB, CO (1980
 Winkler, David F. & Webster, Julie L., Searching the Skies, The Legacy of the United States Cold War Defense Radar Program,  US Army Construction Engineering Research Laboratories, Champaign, IL (1997)

External links

Radar squadrons of the United States Air Force
Aerospace Defense Command units